Piano Trio No. 2 may refer to:
 Piano Trio No. 2 (Beethoven)
 Piano Trio No. 2 (Brahms)
 Piano Trio No. 2 (Dvořák)
 Piano Trio No. 2 (Mendelssohn)
 Piano Trio No. 2 (Mozart)
 Piano Trio No. 2 (Schubert)
 Piano Trio No. 2 (Schumann)
 Piano Trio No. 2 (Shostakovich)